is a passenger railway station located in the city of Nishiwaki, Hyōgo Prefecture, Japan, operated by West Japan Railway Company (JR West).

Lines
Nishiwakishi Station is served by the Kakogawa Line and is 31.2 kilometers from the terminus of the line at

Station layout
The station consists of one ground-level side platform and one ground-level island platform, connected to the station building by a footbridge. The station is staffed.

History
With the privatization of the Japan National Railways (JNR) on 1 April 1987, the station came under the aegis of the West Japan Railway Company. It was renamed to its present name on 31 March 1990. The Kajiya Line, closed in 1990, originated at this station.

Passenger statistics
In fiscal 2019, the station was used by an average of 822 passengers daily

Surrounding area
 Yasaka Shrine
 Hyogo Prefectural Nishiwaki Technical High School
 Nishiwaki City Nishiwaki Minami Junior High School

See also
List of railway stations in Japan

References

External links

  

Railway stations in Hyōgo Prefecture
Railway stations in Japan opened in 1913
Nishiwaki, Hyōgo